Santiago Rafael Luis Manuel José María Derqui Rodríguez (Córdoba June 21, 1809 – Corrientes November 5, 1867) was president of Argentina from March 5, 1860 to November 5, 1861. He was featured on the 10 australes note, which is now obsolete.

Biography
The firstborn son of Manuel José María Derqui y García and his wife Ramona Rodríguez y Orduña, Santiago Derqui studied at the Córdoba National University, receiving a degree in law in 1831. At the university he was professor of law, then of philosophy, and finally vice-dean. On May 14, 1845, he married Modesta García de Cossio y Vedoya Lagraña (1825–1885) with whom he had three boys (Manuel Santiago, Simón, and Santiago Martín Antonio) and three girls (Josefa, Justa Dolores Belisaria, and María del Carmen Modesta Leonor).

He was first assistant and then Minister of the government of Corrientes Province under José María Paz. Justo José de Urquiza named him 'Business administrator' and sent him to Paraguay on a foreign business mission. He became deputy for Córdoba Province. In 1854 Urquiza named him head of the Ministry of Justice, Education and Public Instruction, where he worked for the six years of Urquiza's mandate, pushing forward the still-emerging nation. He was an active Freemason.

After Urquiza's mandate, Derqui became constitutional president. Being from Córdoba and not from Buenos Aires, it was expected that under his rule the continuous revolts of the provincial governments against the federal government would end.

Derqui accepted the revised national constitution with the changes that would favour Buenos Aires, and named the country República Argentina.
This and other unpopular policies towards the rest of the country provoked a general discontent in the provinces that led to the Battle of Pavón. Unable to maintain authority, Derqui resigned and fled to  Montevideo.

While in exile, Bartolomé Mitre helped him to go back to his wife's native city of Corrientes, where he would die a few years later.

References

1809 births
1867 deaths
Politicians from Córdoba, Argentina
Presidents of Argentina
Foreign ministers of Argentina
Members of the Argentine Chamber of Deputies elected in Corrientes
Federales (Argentina)
Argentine Freemasons
National University of Córdoba alumni
19th-century Argentine lawyers